Consultative Status to the United Nations Economic and Social Council (ECOSOC) is granted by the United Nations to non-governmental organizations (NGO's) to allow them to participate in the work of the United Nations. Consultative Status is divided into three categories:
General Consultative Status (formerly Consultative Status 1), the highest level, which may be granted to organizations that are concerned with most of the activities of the council, that are making substantive and sustained contributions in  many fields, with a considerable membership, and that are broadly representative of major segments of society in a large number of countries. These organizations are entitled to deliver oral presentations during the council's meetings.
Special Consultative Status (formerly Consultative Status 2), which may be granted to organizations concerned with only a few of the fields of activity covered by the Council
Roster, which are "other organizations that do not have general or special consultative status but that the Council, or the Secretary-General of the United Nations in consultation with the Council or its Committee on Non-Governmental Organizations, considers can make occasional and useful contributions to the work of the Council."

Twice a year, the United Nations Committee on Non-Governmental Organizations reviews new applications for consultative status and makes recommendations to the ECOSOC, which reviews and decides to approve or deny the recommendations. Consultative Status, depending on level, gives the organizations a number of rights to participate in the work of the UN, to present their views and deliver testimony.

The first time that non-governmental organizations were granted consultative status was in 1946, when 41 organizations were chosen. By 1996, over 1000 NGO's were granted consultative status, and by the year 2000, there were 2050.

As of August 2021, there are a total of 5,591 organizations in consultative status with ECOSOC. There are 141 organizations in general consultative status, 4,483 in special consultative status and 967 on the Roster.

The UN also maintains a database through which the current set of organizations in consultative status can be accessed. A list of all of the organizations, in pdf format, is also available.



General Consultative Status

Special Consultative Status

Roster Status
Asian Media Information and Communication Centre
Asia-Pacific Broadcasting Union
Association of African Universities
Association of Arab Universities
Association of European Universities
Association of Official Analytical Chemists
Caribbean Food Crops Society
Celtic League
Conseil international des organisations de festivals de folklore et d'arts traditionnels
Council for International Organizations of Medical Sciences
European Association for Animal Production
European Association for Research on Plant Breeding
European Atomic Forum
European Broadcasting Union
European Chemical Industry Council
European Computer Manufacturers Association
General Union of Chambers of Commerce, Industry and Agriculture for Arab Countries
Institute of International Law
International Academy of Pathology
International Aeronautical Federation
International Amateur Radio Union
International Association for Cereal Science and Technology
International Association for Suicide Prevention
International Association for the Study of Pain
International Association of Agricultural Information Specialists
International Association of Applied Linguistics
International Association of Classification Societies
International Association of Conference Interpreters
International Association of Dry Cargo Shipowners
International Association of Horticultural Producers
International Association of Independent Tanker Owners
International Association of Universities
International Board on Books for Young People
International Centre for Integrated Mountain Development
International Commission of Agricultural Engineering
International Commission on Illumination
International Commission on Occupational Health
International Commission on Radiation Units and Measurements
International Commission on Radiological Protection
International Council for Control of Iodine Deficiency Disorders
International Council for Philosophy and Humanistic Studies
International Council of Graphic Design Associations
International Council of Marine Industry Associations
International Council of Management Consulting Institutes
International Council of Museums
International Council of Nurses
International Council on Archives
International Diabetes Federation
International Epidemiological Association
International Ergonomics Association
International Federation for Documentation
International Federation for Information Processing
International Federation for Medical and Biological Engineering
International Federation of Automatic Control
International Federation of Catholic Universities
International Federation of Consulting Engineers
International Federation of Gynecology and Obstetrics
International Federation of Library Associations and Institutions
International Federation of Pharmaceutical Manufacturers Associations (IFPMA)
International Federation of Plantation, Agricultural and Allied Workers
International Federation of Translators
International Federation of Workers' Education Associations
International Fertilizer Industry Association
International Food Policy Research Institute
International Institute for Peace
International Life Sciences Institute
International Medical Society of Paraplegia
International Music Council
International Peace Research Association
International Pharmaceutical Federation
International Physicians for the Prevention of Nuclear War
International Political Science Association
International Press Telecommunications Council
International Publishers Association
International Radiation Protection Association
International Society for Photogrammetry and Remote Sensing
International Society of City and Regional Planners
International Sociological Association
International Theatre Institute
International Transport Workers' Federation
International Union of Geodesy and Geophysics
International Union of Microbiological Societies
International Union of Nutritional Sciences
International Union of Pure and Applied Chemistry
Licensing Executives Society International
Medicus Mundi International
Miners' International Federation
Pacific Science Association
Population Action International
Saami Council
Society of Chemical Industry
Soka Gakkai International
Union of Industrial and Employers' Confederations of Europe
World Association of Newspapers
World Energy Conference
World Federation for Medical Education
World Federation of Engineering Organizations
World Federation of Neurosurgical Societies
World Federation of Scientific Workers
World Federation of Societies of Anaesthesiologists
World Heart Federation
World Islamic Call Society
World Medical Association
World Movement of Christian Workers
World Peace Council
World Press Freedom Committee

References

External links

Consultative status to the United Nations Economic and Social Council
United Nations Economic and Social Council
United Nations-related lists